The Oster Conspiracy of 1938 was a proposed plan to overthrow German Führer Adolf Hitler and the Nazi regime if Germany went to war with Czechoslovakia over the Sudetenland. It was led by Generalmajor Hans Oster, deputy head of the Abwehr and other high-ranking conservatives within the Wehrmacht who opposed the regime for behavior that was threatening to bring Germany into a war that they believed it was not ready to fight. They planned to overthrow Hitler and the Nazi regime through a storming of the Reich Chancellery by forces loyal to the plot to take control of the government, who would either arrest or assassinate Hitler, and restore the Monarchy under Prince Wilhelm of Prussia, the grandson of Wilhelm II.

Background

The plot was organised and developed by then Oberstleutnant Hans Oster and Major Helmuth Groscurth of the Abwehr. They drew into the conspiracy such people as Generaloberst Ludwig Beck, General Wilhelm Adam, Generaloberst Walther von Brauchitsch, Generaloberst Franz Halder, Admiral Wilhelm Canaris, and Generalleutnant Erwin von Witzleben. The working plan was for Count Hans-Jürgen von Blumenthal to lead a storm party into the Reich Chancellery and kill Hitler. It would then be necessary to neutralize the Nazi Party apparatus in order to stop them from proceeding with the invasion of Czechoslovakia, which they believed would lead to a war that would ruin Germany.

In addition to these military figures, the conspirators also had contact with Secretary of State Ernst von Weizsäcker and the diplomats Theodor Kordt, Erich Kordt and Hans Bernd Gisevius. Theodor Kordt was considered a vital contact with the British on whom the success of the plot depended; the conspirators needed strong British opposition to Hitler's seizure of the Sudetenland. However, Neville Chamberlain, apprehensive of the possibility of war, negotiated at length with Hitler and eventually conceded strategic areas of Czechoslovakia to him. Poland also invaded Czechoslovakia on 1 October 1938. This destroyed any chance of the plot succeeding, as Hitler was then seen in Germany as the "greatest statesman of all times at the moment of his greatest triumph", and the immediate risk of war had been neutralized.

Aftermath

The plotters survived to become leaders of German resistance to Hitler and Nazism during the Second World War. Oster himself was on active duty until 1943, when placed under house arrest after other Abwehr officers were caught helping Jews to escape Germany. After the failed 20 July Plot on Hitler's life in 1944, the Gestapo seized the diaries of Admiral Wilhelm Canaris, in which Oster's long term anti-Nazi activities were revealed. Oster was executed in April 1945, as Germany was on the verge of defeat - the Nazis being determined that he would not survive their fall.

See also
 Assassination attempts on Adolf Hitler
 Pius XII and the German Resistance

References

Bibliography

Conflicts in 1938
1938 in Germany
German resistance to Nazism
Conspiracies